Hadogenes soutpansbergensis is a scorpion species endemic to South Africa in the bicolor group of the genus Hadogenes. It is named after the Soutpansberg mountain range where it was found.

Taxonomic history
The species was formally described in 2006, although Prendini first collected a pair of adults of this species in 1990.

References

Works cited
 

Endemic fauna of South Africa
Hormuridae
Scorpions of Africa
Animals described in 2006